San Maurizio Canavese is a comune (municipality) in the Metropolitan City of Turin in the Italian region Piedmont, located about  northwest of Turin.  

San Maurizio Canavese borders the following municipalities: San Carlo Canavese, San Francesco al Campo, Cirié, Leinì, Robassomero and Caselle Torinese.

The company Alenia Aeronautica has an office on the property of Turin Caselle Airport and in S. Maurizio Canavese.

History
In pre-Roman times the area  was inhabited by Celt-Ligurian tribes. In the Middle Ages, starting from the 13th century, it was part of the lands of the Marquisses of Montferrat.

During the Unification of Italy, it was, together with Fenestrelle, a location for imprisonment of rebels from the former Kingdom of Two Sicilies. In the late course of World War II, Carlo Angela, father of TV science host Piero Angela and then director of the clinic for mental diseases "Villa Turina Amione" in San Maurizio, gave shelter to several antifascist opposers and Jews fleeing from German  and RSI soldiers.

Main sights
Parish church of San Maurizio Martire
Church of San Rocco

Twin towns
 General Cabrera, Argentina

References

External links
 Official website 

Cities and towns in Piedmont
Canavese